Finlay McCreath (born 16 October 1998) is a Scottish cricketer. In June 2019, he was selected to represent Scotland A in their tour to Ireland to play the Ireland Wolves. He made his List A debut for Scotland A against the Ireland Wolves on 5 June 2019. He made his Twenty20 debut for Scotland A against the Ireland Wolves on 9 June 2019.

Prior to his List A debut, he was named in Scotland's squad for the 2016 Under-19 Cricket World Cup. In March 2022, he was named in Scotland's One Day International (ODI) squad for the 2022 Papua New Guinea Tri-Nation Series tournament as a travelling reserve player.

References

External links
 

1998 births
Living people
Scottish cricketers
Place of birth missing (living people)